During the American Civil War, a department was a geographical command within the Union's military organization, usually reporting directly to the War Department.  Many of the Union's departments were named after rivers or other bodies of water, such as the Department of the Potomac and the Department of the Tennessee.  The geographical boundaries of such departments changed frequently, as did their names.  As the armies became larger Departments began to be subordinated to Military Divisions, and the Departments were often sub divided into Districts and from 1862 Subdistricts.   Much information on Civil War departments can be found in Eicher & Eicher, Civil War High Commands.

Civil War

1861

Eastern Theater
Department of the East, to August 17, 1861 (Discontinued)
Department of Washington, April 9, 1861 - July 25, 1861 (Merged into Military District of the Potomac)
Department of Pennsylvania, April 27, 1861 - July 25, 1861 (Merged into Department of the Potomac)
Department of Annapolis, April 27, 1861, - July 19, 1861; renamed Department of Maryland, July 19, 1861 - July 25, 1861, (Merged into Dept. of Pennsylvania)
Department of Virginia, May, 1861 - July 15. 1863 (Merged into Dept. of Virginia and North Carolina)
Department of Northeastern Virginia, May 27, 1861 – July 25, 1861 (Merged into the Military District of the Potomac)
 Department of the Shenandoah July 19, 1861 - August 17, 1861 (Merged into the Department of the Potomac)
Military District of the Potomac July 25 - August 15, 1861: renamed Department and Army of the Potomac, August 15, 1861 - June 27, 1865
 Coast Division, 1861–62
 Dix's Division, 1861–62
Department of New England, Oct 1, 1861 - February 20, 1862. (Discontinued)
Department of New York,  October 26, 1861 - January 3, 1863 (Merged into Department of the East)
Department of the Rappahannock, April 4, 1862 - June 26, 1862 (Merged into the Army of Virginia)
Mountain Department, March 11, 1862 - June 26, 1862 (Merged into the Army of Virginia)

Lower Seaboard Theater

Department of Florida, Apr. 13, 1861 - March 15, 1862 (Merged into Department of the South)
South Carolina Expeditionary Corps, October 1861 - April 1862

Western Theater

Department of the Cumberland, September–November 1861; Army of the Ohio, 1861 - October 24, 1862 (Renamed (Army of the Cumberland)
Department of the Ohio and Department of the Ohio (Louisville), May 3, 1861 - March 11, 1862 (dissolved and merged into the Department of the Mississippi and the Mountain Department)
Army of Occupation of Western Virginia, June 14 - September 19, 1861
Department of Kentucky, May 28, 1861 - August 15, 1861 (Merged into the Dept. of the Cumberland)
Department of Western Virginia, October 11, 1861 - March 11, 1862. (Merged into Mountain Department)
District of the Kanawha, 1861-62 (Merged into Mountain Department)
Railroad District, 1861–62
Camp Carlisle, VA, later renamed Camp Willey, WV, 1861–64
Post at Grafton, WV, 1862 
Post at Point Pleasant, WV, 1862

Trans-Mississippi Theater

Department of the West, to July 3, 1861 (merged into the Western Department)
 Army of the West , July 2 - August 10, 1861
Western Department, July 3 - November 9, 1861
Kansas Brigade, 1861
Army of the West, July 2 - August 10, 1861
Western Army, September 14 - October 24, 1861
Department of the Missouri, November 9, 1861–62
District of Cairo, 1861–62
District of Southeast Missouri, 1861
District of Central Missouri, 1861–65
Southwestern District, 1861–62
St. Louis District, 1861–65
 Army of the West, 1861
Department of Kansas, November 9, 1861–65
Department of New Mexico, to July 3, 1861, (merged into Western Department); Restored  November 9, 1861 - June 27, 1865
 post at Albuquerque, NM, - 1865
District of Santa Fe, 1861–62
Eastern District of New Mexico, 1861–62
Southern District of New Mexico, 1861–62

Pacific Theater
Pacific Department, January 15, 1861 - July 27, 1865
District of California, January 15, 1861–64
District of Oregon, January 15, 1861- July 27, 1865
District of Southern California, September 25, 1861 - July 27, 1865
California Volunteers, August 1861 - 1866
Column from California, December 9, 1861–62
District of Humboldt, December 12, 1861 - 1869

1862

Eastern Theater
 Department of North Carolina, January 7, 1862 - July 15, 1863 (Merged into Department of Virginia and North Carolina)
 Burnside's North Carolina Expedition, February - June 1862
 Middle Department, March 22, 1862 -  June 26, 1862; consolidated Middle Department and 8th Army Corps, June 26, 1862 - June 27, 1865 
 VIII Corps, July 12, 1862 - June 26, 1862
 Railroad District, June 26, 1862 - Sept. 20, 1862
 Department of the Rappahannock, April 4, 1862 - June 26, 1862 (Merged into the Army of Virginia)
 Department of the Shenandoah, Recreated April 4, 1862 - June 26, 1862 (Merged into Army of Virginia)
 Army of Virginia, June 26, 1862 - September 12, 1862 (Merged into Army of the Potomac)
 I Corps, Army of Virginia from Mountain Department, June 26, 1862 - September 12, 1862 (renamed XI Corps)
 II Corps, Army of Virginia from Dept. of the Shenandoah, June 26, 1862 - September 2, 1862 (renamed XII Corps) 
 III Corps, Army of Virginia from Dept. of the Rappahannock, June 26, 1862 - September 2, 1862 (renamed I Corps)
 Department and Army of the Potomac, - 1865
 Coast Division, -  February 1862 (to Burnside's North Carolina Expedition)
 Dix's Division, - March 22, 1862, (to Middle Department) 
 I Corps, March 3, 1862 - June 26, 1862 (to Army of Virginia)
 I Corps, September 2, 1862 -  
 II Corps, March 3, 1862 - 1863
 III Corps, March 3, 1862 - 1863
 IV Corps, March 3, 1862 - August 1862, to Dpt. of Virginia
 V Corps, March 3, 1862 - 1863
 VI Corps, June 26, 1862 - 1863
 IX Corps, July 22, 1862 - 1863
 XI Corps, September 12, 1862 – 1864
 Military District of Washington, 1862 
 Sturgis' Division - June 26, 1862 (Merged into Army of Virginia)
 Defenses of Harpers Ferry, WV (Pleasant Valley, MD), 1862
 Defenses of Washington, 1862-1863
 Military Defenses, Southwest Potomac, 1862
 Department of Virginia, - July 15. 1863

Lower Seaboard Theater

 Department of Key West, February 1862 - March 15, 1862.(Merged into Department of the South)
 Department of the Gulf, February 23, 1862 - June 27, 1865
 Army of the Gulf, February 23, 1862 - June 27, 1865
 Troops in West Florida, August 8, 1862 - 1863 (from Dept. of the South)
 Department of the South, March 15, 1862 - June 28, 1865
 South Carolina Expeditionary Corps - April 1862
 Western District, 1862
 Southern District, 1862
 Northern District, 1862
 U.S. Forces, Edisto and James Islands, SC, 1862
 posts at Hilton Head, SC, 1862–64
 posts at St. Augustine, FL, 1862–63
 posts at Fort Taylor, FL, 1862 
 posts at Fort Pickens, FL, 1862
 Troops in West Florida - August 8, 1862 - 63(annexed to Dept. of the Gulf)

Western Theater
 Department of the Ohio - August 19, 1862 - January 17, 1865 (Annexed to Department of the Cumberland) 
 District of Louisville, 1862
 Railroad District of Western Virginia, Sept. 1862 - Jan 1863
 District of Western Kentucky, 1862–63
 Army of Kentucky, 1862–63
 District of Central Kentucky, 1863
 District of Ohio, 1863
 Army of Ohio in the Field, 1863
 (Military) District of Kentucky, 1863–65
 Department of the Cumberland, October 24, 1862 - June 27, 1865
 Army of the Cumberland, October 24, 1862 - June 27, 1865
 Mountain Department March 11, 1862 - June 26, 1862 (Merged into Army of Virginia)
 Cheat Mountain District, 1862.
 District of the Kanawha, 1862.
 Railroad District, March 11, 1862 - July 7, 1862
 Department of Mississippi March 15 - September 19, 1862
 Department and Army of the Tennessee, October 16, 1862 - August 1, 1865

Trans-Mississippi Theater

Department of the Missouri, 1862–65
Department of the Northwest September 6, 1862 - June 27, 1865 (merged with the Department of the Missouri)
 Department of Kansas, - 1865
 Department of New Mexico, to June 27, 1865
 District of Santa Fe, - 1862
 Eastern District of New Mexico, - 1862
 Southern District of New Mexico, - 1862
 post at Albuquerque, NM, - 1865 
 post at Fort Canby, NM, 1862–65
 post at Fort Craig, NM, 1862–65
 post at Las Cruces, NM, 1862–65
 post at Los Pinos, NM, 1862–65
 post at Fort Marcy, NM, 1862–65
 post at Camp Mimbres, NM, 1862–65
 post at Fort Sumner, NM, 1862–65
 post at Fort West, NM, 1862–65

Pacific  Theater
 Pacific Department, - July 27, 1865
 District of California, - 1864
 District of Oregon, - 1865
 District of Southern California, - 1865
 California Volunteers, - 1866
 District of the Humboldt, - 1869
 Column from California, - August 30, 1862
 District of Arizona, (headquarters at Franklin, TX) August 30, 1862 - 1865
 District of Utah August 6, 1862 - July 27, 1865

1863

Eastern Theater

 Department of the East, January 3, 1863 - 1873
 District of Western New York, 1864–65 
 District of Northern New York, 1864–65
 District of New Jersey, 1865
 District of Rhode Island and Connecticut, 1865
 District of Maine, 1865–66 
 District of Massachusetts, New Hampshire, and Vermont, 1865–66
 District of Northern and Western New York, 1865–66
 District of Champlain, 1866
 consolidated Middle Department and 8th Army Corps, June 26, 1862 - June 27, 1865 
 Defenses of the Upper Potomac, Jan 5 - Feb 1863. (Discontinued) 
 District of Delaware, 1863–65
 Department and Army of the Potomac, - 1865 
 I Corps, September 2, 1862 -  
 II Corps, March 3, 1862 - 1863
 III Corps, March 3, 1862 - 1863
 IV Corps, March 3, 1862 - August 1862, to Department of Virginia
 V Corps, March 3, 1862 - 1863
 VI Corps, June 26, 1862 - 1863
 IX Corps, July 22, 1862 - April 2, 1863 to Department of Ohio
 XI Corps, September 12, 1862 – 1864
 consolidated Department of Washington and XXII Corps, February 2, 1863 - 1865
 Department of the Susquehanna, June 9, 1863 - December 1, 1864 (Changed to Dept. of Pennsylvania)
 Department of Virginia - July 15, 1863
 Department of North Carolina - July 15, 1863
 Department of Virginia and North Carolina, July 15, 1863 - January 31, 1865

Lower Seaboard Theater

 Department of the South,  1863- June 28, 1865
 X Corps (Union Army), 1863
 posts at Hilton Head, SC, -1864
 posts at St. Augustine, FL, - 1863

Western Theater
 Department of the Monongahela, June 9, 1863 - April 6, 1864 (Merged into Dept. of the Susquehanna)
 Department of West Virginia, June, 1863 - June 27, 1865
 Department of the Ohio - October 16, 1863
 District of Indiana, March 23, 1863 - June 5, 1863
 District of Indiana and Michigan, June 5, 1863 - September 11, 1863
 District of Indiana, September 11, 1863 - November 16, 1863 
 Railroad District of Western Virginia, - Jan 1863
 District of Western Kentucky, - 1863
 Army of Kentucky, - 1863
 District of Central Kentucky, 1863
 District of Ohio, 1863
 Army of Ohio in the Field, 1863
 (Military) District of Kentucky, 1863–65
 Department of the Cumberland, 1863 - October 16, 1863
 Army of the Cumberland, 1863 - June 27, 1865
 Department and Army of the Tennessee, 1863 - October 16, 1863
 Military Division of the Mississippi, October 16, 1863 – August 6, 1866
 Department of the Cumberland, October 16, 1863–65
 Department of the Ohio, October 16, 1863–65
 Department of the Tennessee, October 16, 1863–64
 XIX Corps, 1864
 Department of North Carolina, 1865

Trans-Mississippi Theater
 Department of the Northwest, - June 27, 1865
 Department of the Missouri, - 1865
 Department of Kansas, - 1865
 Department of New Mexico, to June 27, 1865
 post at Albuquerque, NM, - 1865 
 post at Fort Canby, NM, - 1865
 post at Las Cruces, NM, - 1865
 post at Los Pinos, NM, - 1865
 post at Fort Marcy, NM, - 1865
 post at Camp Mimbres, NM, - 1865
 post at Fort Sumner, NM, - 1865
 post at Fort West, NM, - 1865
 District of Fort Craig, August 27, 1864 – November 23, 1864
 post at Fort Craig, NM, August 27, 1864 – November 23, 1864
 Fort McRae, NM, Oct. 1863 - 1876
 post at Franklin, TX, 1863-64.

Pacific Theater
 Department of the Pacific - July 27, 1865

1864

Eastern Theater
Middle Military Division, August 6, 1864 - June 27, 1865
 consolidated Middle Department and 8th Army Corps,  - June 27, 1865 
 District of Delaware, - 1865
 District of Eastern Shore of Maryland, 1864–65
Department of Pennsylvania December 1, 1864–65
 Department of the Susquehanna, 1864
 Department of Washington, 1864–65
 Department of West Virginia, 1864-65.
 Department and Army of the Potomac, 1864 - June 27, 1865
 Department of Virginia and North Carolina - January 31, 1865
 Army of the James, April 28, 1864 - August 1, 1865
 XVIII Corps, April 28, 1864 - December 3, 1864
 X Corps, April 28, 1864 - December 3, 1864
 XXV Corps, December 3, 1864 - May, 1865
 XXIV Corps, December 3, 1864 - August 1, 1865
 Expedition to Fort Fisher, December, 1864 - January 15, 1865

Lower Seaboard Theater

 Department of the South, 1864 - June 28, 1865
 U.S. Forces, Morris Island, SC, 1864–65;
 posts at Hilton Head, SC, -1864
 Northern District, 1864–65
 District of Florida, 1864–65
 Department of the Gulf, - May 7, 1864
 Military Division of West Mississippi May 7, 1864 - May 1865 (Discontinued)
 consolidated Department of Arkansas and 7th Army Corps, May 7, 1864 - March 21, 1865 (transferred to Military Division of Missouri)
 District of Little Rock, May 7, 1864 - March 21, 1865
 Fort Smith and Indian Territory, May 7, 1864 - March 21, 1865
 Department of the Gulf, May 7, 1864 - May, 1865

Western Theater

 Northern Department, January 12, 1864 - June 27, 1865
 District of Illinois, 1864–65 
 Post at Camp Douglas (Post of Chicago), 1864–65 
 District of Indiana, 1864–65
 Post at Rock Island Barracks, IL, 
 Post at Camp Carrington, 1864–65 
 Post at Evansville, 1864–65 
 Post at Indianapolis, 1864–65 
 Post at Madison, 1864–65 
 Post at Camp Morton, 1864–65
 Post atBurnside Barracks (Indianapolis), 1864–65 
 Post at New Albany, IN, 1864–65
 District of Michigan, 1864–65
 Post of Detroit, MI, 1864–65  
 U.S. Forces, Johnson's Island, OH, 1864
 Post at Johnson's Island, OH, 1864-65. 
 Post at Sandusky, OH, 1864-65.
 Military Division of the Mississippi, - August 6, 1866
 Department of the Cumberland, - 1865
 Department of the Ohio, - 1865
 District of East Tennessee April 10, 1864 - Jan. 4, 1865 (to Dept. of the Cumberland)
 Department of the Tennessee, - 1864; to Army of Georgia
 XIX Corps, 1864
 Army of Georgia, November 1864 - June 1, 1865
 XIV Corps November 1864 - June 1, 1865
 XX Corps November 1864 - June 1, 1865

Trans-Mississippi Theater

 Department of the Northwest, - June 27, 1865
 Department of the Missouri, - 1865
Department of Kansas, 1864–65
District of North Kansas, 1864–65
Districts of South Kansas, 1864–65
East Sub-district of Nebraska, 1864–65
consolidated Department of Arkansas and 7th Army Corps, January 6, 1864 - May 7, 1864, to Military Division West Mississippi 
 District of Little Rock, January 6, 1864 - March 21, 1865
 Fort Smith, April 17, 1864 - March 21, 1865
 Department of New Mexico, to June 27, 1865
 District of Northern Arizona October 23, 1863 - 1864

Pacific Theater
 Department of the Pacific - July 27, 1865
 District of California
Sub-district of Nevada (headquartered at Fort Churchill)
 District of Oregon

1865

Eastern Theater

 Middle Military Division,  - June 27, 1865
 consolidated Middle Department and 8th Army Corps, - June 27, 1865 
 District of Delaware, - 1865
 District of Eastern Shore of Maryland, - 1865
 District of Delaware and Eastern Shore of Maryland, 1865
 District of Western Maryland, 1865
 District of West Virginia, 1865
 District of Baltimore, 1865 - 1866
 Department of Pennsylvania, - 1865
 Department of Washington, - 1865
 Department of West Virginia, - 1865
 Department and Army of the Potomac, 1864 - June 27, 1865
 Department of Virginia and North Carolina, - January 31, 1865
 Army of the James, - January 31, 1865
 XXV Corps, - January 31, 1865
 XXIV Corps, - January 31, 1865
 Expedition to Fort Fisher, - January 15, 1865
 Department of Virginia and Army of the James, January 31, 1865 - April 19, 1865 
 Army of the James, January 31, 1865 - August 1, 1865
 XXV Corps, January 31, 1865 - May, 1865
 XXIV Corps, January 31, 1865 - August 1, 1865
 District of Eastern Virginia, 1865 
 Sub District of Appomattox, 1865
 Sub District of Holston, 1865
 Provost Marshal field organizations, Bermuda Hundred, Drummondtown, Camp Hamilton, Norfolk, Onancock, and Petersburg, VA, 1865
 U.S. Forces, Petersburg, VA, 1865
 Defenses of Norfolk and Portsmouth, VA, 1865
 Camp of Distribution, Richmond, VA, 1865; 
 Libby Prison, Richmond, VA, 1865
 Norfolk Military Prison, VA, 1865
 post at Newport News, VA, 1865.
 post at Petersburg, VA, 1865.
 Department of North Carolina, January 31, 1865 - April 19, 1865
 Military Division of the James, April 19, 1865 - June 27, 1865
 Department of Virginia, April 19, 1865 - June 27, 1865
 Department of North Carolina, April 19, 1865 - June 27, 1865
 Army of the James, April 19, 1865 - August 1, 1865
 XXV Corps, April 19, 1865 - May, 1865
 XXIV Corps, April 19, 1865 - August 1, 1865

Lower Seaboard Theater

 Department of the South, - June 28, 1865
 U.S. Forces, Morris Island, SC, -1865
 (Military) District of Eastern South Carolina, 1865
 District of Savannah, 1865
 posts at Jacksonville, FL, 1865

Western Theater
 Military Division of the Mississippi, - August 6, 1866
 Department of the Cumberland, - 1865
 District of East Tennessee, January. 4 - March. 17, 1865 (to Dept. of the Cumberland)
 Department of the Ohio, - 1865
 Department of North Carolina, 1865
 Army of Georgia, November 1864 - June 1, 1865
 XIV Corps - June 1, 1865
 XX Corps - June 1, 1865
Department of Kentucky, February 10, 1865 - June 27, 1865

Trans-Mississippi Theater
 
 Department of the Northwest, - June 27, 1865
 Department of the Missouri, - June 27, 1865
 Department of Kansas, - June 27, 1865
 District of North Kansas, - 1865
 Districts of South Kansas, - 1865
 East Sub-district of Nebraska, - 1865
 Department of New Mexico, to June 27, 1865 (became District of New Mexico, Department of California, Military Division of the Pacific)
 Military Division of the Southwest May 29, 1865 - June 27, 1865. (Territory in the Trans - Mississippi south of the Arkansas River - Major General Philip H. Sheridan. Merged into the Military Division of the Gulf) 
 Department of Louisiana and Texas, May 29, 1865 - June 27, 1865
 Southern Division of Louisiana, May 29, 1865 - June 27, 1865.

Pacific Theater
 Department of the Pacific - July 27, 1865 (Merged into the Military Division of the Pacific)
 District of Arizona (headquarters at Prescott) March 7, 1865 - July 27, 1865
 Military Division of the Pacific July 27, 1865 - July 3, 1891
 Department of California, 1865-1913
 Department of the Columbia, 1865-1913 
 U.S. Forces, San Juan Island, 1865–72

Notes

References
 Eicher, John H., & David J. Eicher, Civil War High Commands, Stanford University Press, 2001, .
  National Archives, Guide to Federal Records; Records of United States Army Continental Commands, 1821-1920 (Record Group 393), 1817-1940 (bulk 1817-1920)

Departments and districts of the United States Army
Union Army departments